Bonn UN Campus station is a railway station in the town of Bonn, North Rhine-Westphalia, Germany. The station lies on the West Rhine Railway. Its name is derived from the UN Campus, Bonn.

Location
The station is located on the border between the districts Gronau and Kessenich on the Left Rhine line between Bonn Hauptbahnhof and Bonn-Bad Godesberg. The aim of the construction project was the better connection to the northern part of the federal district. It was implemented at Genscherallee, not far from the Kunst- und Ausstellungshalle der Bundesrepublik Deutschland, Kunstmuseum Bonn and the headquarters of Deutsche Telekom and Deutsche Post. The name UN Campus refers to the center of the 19 United Nations organizations based in Bonn and is one of the city's biggest focal points of employment. However, the station will not only prove beneficial for visitors to UN organizations, but also for commuters from other companies such as Deutsche Telekom and Deutsche Post.

References

Railway stations in Bonn
Railway stations in Germany opened in 2017